Egypt–South Korean relations are foreign relations between Egypt and South Korea. Both countries established diplomatic relations on April 13, 1995. Egypt has an embassy in Seoul and South Korea has an embassy in Cairo.

See also 
 Foreign relations of Egypt
 Foreign relations of South Korea

External links 
 Egyptian embassy in Seoul
  South Korean Ministry of Foreign Affairs and Trade about relations with Egypt
  South Korean embassy in Cairo